The 1988 New Hampshire gubernatorial election took place on November 6, 1988. Incumbent Governor John Sununu did not run for re-election, and was succeeded by U.S. Representative Judd Gregg.

, this marks the most recent time that Republicans won the races for Governor and for President concurrently, although they came close to doing so in 2016.

Election results

References

See also

New Hampshire
1988
Gubernatorial